These are the official results of the men's 400 metres hurdles event at the 1983 IAAF World Championships in Helsinki, Finland. There were a total number of 34 participating athletes, with five qualifying heats, two semi-finals and the final held on 9 August 1983.

Medalists

Records
Existing records at the start of the event.

Final

Semi-finals
Held on Monday 1983-08-08

Qualifying heats
Held on Sunday 1983-08-07

See also
 1980 Men's Olympic 400m Hurdles (Moscow)
 1982 Men's European Championships 400m Hurdles (Athens)
 1984 Men's Olympic 400m Hurdles (Los Angeles)

References
 Results

H
400 metres hurdles at the World Athletics Championships